Albasini is an Italian surname. Notable people with the surname include:

João Albasini (1813–1888), South African trader
Michael Albasini (born 1980), Swiss cyclist

See also
Albasini Dam, a dam in Limpopo Province, South Africa

Italian-language surnames